This article is a list of governors of Trois-Rivières:

On August 10, 1764, eighteen months after the signing of the Treaty of Paris, the post of Governor of Trois-Rivières was abolished.

See also

 Governor of Montreal
 Governor of Acada
 Governor of Sailplane
 Governor of Louisiana

References

Sources
  Trois-Rivières (division_administrative_seigneuriale), in the site La mémoire du Québec

New France
Political history of Quebec
Lists of political office-holders in Quebec